William M. Feehan is a fireboat built for and operated by the New York City Fire Department (FDNY). Her namesake, William M. Feehan, was the oldest and most senior FDNY firefighter to perish in the line of duty on September 11, 2001. Her nameplate is carved from a steel plate salvaged from the collapse of the World Trade Center. The vessel's $4.7 million cost was largely covered by a FEMA Port Security Grant Program.

The boat is designed to operate in shallow waters, including bay areas close to Laguardia and John F. Kennedy airports. She also has systems to protect those onboard from chemical, biological, radiological and nuclear hazards using a pressurized and filtered cabin.

She was built in Kingston, Ontario, at MetalCraft Marine. Wellwishers gathered to welcome her as she transited the Oswego Canal, Erie Canal, and Hudson River.

The fireboat entered service on November 20, 2015.

Specifications
Constructed by MetalCraft Marine at Kingston, Ontario, William M. Feehan cost $4.7 million to build. William M. Feehan is equipped with five water cannons, projecting 8,000 gallons per minute.

References 

Fireboats of New York City
2015 ships
Ships built in Ontario